Rodan is a fictional flying monster.

Rodan may also refer to:

Rodan (film), the debut film of the flying monster
Rodan (band), an early-1990s rock band
Rodan Energy, a leading North American smart grid company (see its president & Ceo Paul Grod)
Rodan, a Time Lady who appears in the Doctor Who serial The Invasion of Time
Rodan, an early 4th century Roman gladiator, depicted in the Gladiator Mosaic.
Rodan, a military version of Odra series computers.
Rodan (given name), a slavonic name related to the adjective native.

See also
Auguste Rodin (1840–1917), French artist, most famous as a sculptor
David Rodan (born 1983), Fijian Australian rules footballer
Radon, a chemical element
Perry Rhodan, the world's most prolific science fiction (SF) series, published since 1961 in Germany